Magnolia silvioi is an endemic species of Antioquia department. Common names include: guanábano de monte, fruta de molinillo, guanabanillo.

Description
They are trees reaching up to 35 m height and 100 cm in diameter. Leaves alternate, simple, spirally arranged, coriaceous, elliptic, measuring from 11 to 26 cm long and from 7,4 to 12 cm wide; petiole greatly thickened at the base and present a scar that cover it completely. Flowers have cream color, two bracts up to 5 cm long covering the flower bud; three sepals and seven petals. The fruits are subglobose to ovoid, large, up to 16 cm long; 1-2 seeds per carpel with red cover.

Distribution and habitat
This is an endemic species of Antioquia department. It is distributed in Central Andes in two regions in Northeast and East of the department in the medium valley of Magdalena River. The altitudinal range goes from 400 to 1’550 m.

Uses
In the past the wood was used in building structures for mining. Today is possibly used as saw timber. It has great potential as ornamental and has been used with this purpose in Valle del Aburrá and has been shown good development.

Conservation status
It is listed in category “Endangered” (EN) in the Red Book of Plants of Colombia due to its small range distribution and also in forests subject to overexplotacion of saw timber and roundwood.

References

External links
 Botanical Garden of Medellín, and its scientific Director Alvaro Cogollo, leading Magnolia conservation science in Antioquia department.
 South Pole Carbon, company leading a Magnolia conservation programme in Antioquia with the help of carbon finance.

Endemic flora of Colombia
silvioi